22nd Regiment or 22nd Infantry Regiment may refer to:

Infantry regiments
 Royal 22nd Regiment, a unit of the Canadian Army
 22nd Punjab regiment, a unit of the British Indian Army until 1922
 22nd Infantry Regiment (North Korea), a unit of the North Korean Army
 Lapland Ranger Regiment, also designated as the "22nd Light Infantry Regiment", a unit of the Swedish Army
 Värmland Regiment, also designated as the "22nd Infantry Regiment", a unit of the Swedish Army
 22nd Regiment, Special Air Service, a unit of the British Army
22nd Regiment of Foot, later known as the "Cheshire Regiment", an infantry regiment of the British Army
22nd Infantry Regiment (United States), a current unit of the United States Army
22nd Marine Regiment (United States), a unit of the United States Marine Corps during World War II

Cavalry regiments
 22nd Dragoons, a unit of the British Army

Engineering regiments
 22nd Engineer Regiment (Australia), a unit of the Australian Army
 22 Engineer Regiment (United Kingdom), a unit of the British Army's Royal Engineers

American Civil War regiments
 22nd Regiment Alabama Infantry, a unit of the Confederate (Southern) Army during the American Civil War
 22nd Illinois Volunteer Infantry Regiment, a unit of the Union (Northern) Army during the American Civil War
 22nd Regiment Indiana Infantry, a unit of the Union (Northern) Army during the American Civil War
 22nd Iowa Volunteer Infantry Regiment, a unit of the Union (Northern) Army during the American Civil War
 22nd Regiment Kansas Militia Infantry, a unit of the Union (Northern) Army during the American Civil War
 22nd Regiment Kentucky Volunteer Infantry, a unit of the Union (Northern) Army during the American Civil War
 22nd Regiment Massachusetts Volunteer Infantry, a unit of the Union (Northern) Army during the American Civil War
 22nd Michigan Volunteer Infantry Regiment, a unit of the Union (Northern) Army during the American Civil War
 22nd New York Volunteer Infantry Regiment, a unit of the Union (Northern) Army during the American Civil War
 22nd Pennsylvania Cavalry Regiment, a unit of the Union (Northern) Army during the American Civil War
 22nd Virginia Infantry Regiment, a unit of the Confederate (Southern) Army during the American Civil War
 22nd Virginia Cavalry, a unit of the Confederate (Southern) Army during the American Civil War
 22nd Wisconsin Volunteer Infantry Regiment, a unit of the Union (Northern) Army during the American Civil War

American Revolutionary War regiments
 22nd Continental Regiment, served in the Continental Army from 1775 to 1776 during the Revolutionary War